The Washington Wave was an American lacrosse team. They were a member of the Eagle Pro Box Lacrosse League and the Major Indoor Lacrosse League from 1987 to 1989. They were based in Washington, D.C. and played in the Capital Centre in Landover, Maryland. The team's first coach, Bud Beardmore, was the respected former coach who won two national titles with the Maryland Terrapins. Also playing for this early NLL team were well-known players Brad Kotz and Frank Urso.

All time record

Playoff results

References

Sports in Washington, D.C.
Defunct National Lacrosse League teams
Lacrosse clubs established in 1987
Sports clubs disestablished in 1989
Major Indoor Lacrosse League teams
Lacrosse teams in Maryland
1987 establishments in Maryland
1989 disestablishments in Maryland
Landover, Maryland